Beaded Dreams Through Turquoise Eyes is the sixth studio album by the Mexican American/Native American funk rock band Redbone. It was released on Epic Records In October 1974, and was met with mixed reviews. It was co-produced by the brothers Pat Vegas (bass,"roto"-bass, vocals) and Lolly Vegas (lead guitar, vocals). It contains five songs on each side, and six extra tracks when it was re-released on CD in 2013. The record charted on the US Billboard 200 in 1974, peaking at number 174. The record is just over a half hour long. All four members of the band contributed to vocals, and an additional three backing vocalists were recruited for this project. Several members contributed to various percussion, and three additional personnel members were recruited for string arrangements.

Track listing

Side one
"One More Time" (L. Vegas) – 2:52
"Suzi Girl" (L. Vegas) – 2:54
"Only You and Rock and Roll" (P. Vegas/L. Vegas) – 2:58
"Blood Sweat and Tears" (P. Vegas) – 2:48
"Cookin' with D'Redbone" (L. Vegas) - 3:05

Side two
"(Beaded Dreams Through) Turquoise Eyes" (P. Vegas) – 3:07
"Beautiful Illusion" (L. Vegas) – 3:47
"Interstate Highway 101" (P. Vegas) – 2:54
"I'll Never Stop Loving You" (P. Vegas/L. Vegas) - 2:46
"Moon When Four Eclipse" (L. Vegas) - 4:45

Bonus cuts on 2013 expanded CD
"I've Got to Find the Right Woman" (L. Vegas) - 3:13
"Physical Attraction" (P. Vegas) - 2:57
"Keep Me Uptight" (P. Vegas/L. Vegas) - 6:06
"To Get the Love I Need" (P. Vegas/L. Vegas) - 2:59
"A Little Bitty Ditty" (P. Vegas/L. Vegas) - 2:57
"Echoes from Another Planet" (P. Vegas) - 3:39

Charts

Personnel
 Lolly Vegas – lead guitar, lead vocals
 Tony Bellamy – rhythm guitar, congas, background vocals
 Pat Vegas – Fender bass, "Roto-bass", lead vocals
 Butch Rillera – drums, percussion, background vocals

Additional personnel
 Bonnie Bramlett – backing vocals
 Merry Clayton – backing vocals
 Clydie King – backing vocals
 Gene Page – string arrangements
 Dave Blumberg – string arrangements

References

1974 albums
Redbone (band) albums
Epic Records albums